Lee Kang-sheng (born 21 October 1968) is a Taiwanese actor, film director and screenwriter. He has appeared in all of Tsai Ming-liang's feature films. Lee's directorial efforts include The Missing in 2003 and Help Me Eros in 2007.

Career
Lee was working at an arcade when he was asked by Tsai Ming-liang to act in his TV film Boys. This started a working relationship that has lasted over 30 years; Tsai has said that he would never make another movie without Lee.

Awards
Lee has received recognition for his acting by winning the Best Actor Award at the 2002 Cinemanila International Film Festival for What Time Is It There? and getting nominated for a Golden Horse Award in 1994 for Vive L'Amour.

Lee won several awards with his directorial debut, The Missing. At the 2004 Rotterdam International Film Festival, he won the KNF Award, the NETPAC Award and the Tiger Award. The film also won the New Currents Award at the 2004 Pusan International Film Festival, a special mention at the Ljubljana International Film Festival and the City of Athens Award at the Athens International Film Festival.

His second directorial effort, Help Me Eros in 2007, was nominated for a Golden Lion at the Venice Film Festival. It won a special jury award at the 2007 World Film Festival of Bangkok.

Filmography

As actor

As screenwriter-director

References

External links

The Missing: An Interview with Lee Kang-sheng at Senses of Cinema
The Unprofessional: An Interview with Lee Kang-sheng at UCLA Asia Institute
Conversation with Tsai Ming-liang and Lee Kang-sheng at Asia Society

1968 births
Living people
Male actors from Taipei
Taiwanese male film actors
Film directors from Taipei
Taiwanese screenwriters
Taiwanese male television actors
20th-century Taiwanese male actors
21st-century Taiwanese male actors